The 2016 Speedway Grand Prix season was the 22nd season of the Speedway Grand Prix era, and decided the 71st FIM Speedway World Championship. It was the sixteenth series under the promotion of Benfield Sports International, an IMG company. Tai Woffinden was the defending champion from 2015.

Greg Hancock won the title, the fourth of his career. He won the series by nine points from 2015 champion Woffinden, who finished second ahead of debutant Bartosz Zmarzlik. Jason Doyle was leading the series with two rounds to go, but suffered an injury in his first heat during the penultimate round in Poland and was unable to complete the season. He eventually finished fifth, behind Australian compatriot and 2012 world champion Chris Holder, who won his home Grand Prix in Melbourne (his first SGP win since 2012) to move in fourth in the standings.

The title lifted Hancock to sixth on the all-time list, joining Ivan Mauger and Tony Rickardsson (6 each), Ove Fundin (5) and Barry Briggs and Hans Nielsen (4 each) as riders to win at least four individual world championships.

Qualification 
For the 2016 season there were 15 permanent riders, joined at each Grand Prix by one wild card and two track reserves.

The top eight riders from the 2015 championship qualified automatically. Those riders were joined by the three riders who qualified via the Grand Prix Challenge.

The final four riders were nominated by series promoters, Benfield Sports International, following the completion of the 2015 season.

Qualified riders

Qualified substitutes 

The following riders were nominated as substitutes:

Fredrik Lindgren replaced the injured Jarosław Hampel for the first six rounds. Hampel then officially withdrew from the competition on 22 August 2016, promoting Lindgren to a full-time place in the series.

Calendar 

The 2016 season consisted of 11 events, one less than the 2015 series.

Final Classification

See also 
 2016 Individual Speedway Junior World Championship
 2017 Speedway Grand Prix

References

External links 
 SpeedwayGP.com – Speedway World Championships

 
2016
Grand Prix